Kathryn Jane Gleadle is an academic historian specialising in the experiences of British women in the late 18th and 19th centuries. In 2015, she was appointed a Professor of Gender and Women's History by the University of Oxford.

Career 
Kathryn Jane Gleadle graduated with a bachelor of arts degree from the University of Warwick before completing a doctor of philosopher degree at the University of Warwick. She was a fellow of University College, Oxford, from 2002 to 2004, when she was appointed a fellow of Mansfield College, Oxford, and a university lecturer in modern history, appointments made permanent in 2009. In 2015, she was awarded the title of Professor of Gender and Women's History by the University of Oxford.

Works 

Gleadle's research focuses on women's experiences in 18th- and 19th-century Britain, especially with reference to political culture, while she also engages in debates about feminist and gender history theory. Her studies have also focused on the role that Victorian women played in the process of globalisation, and on the way British children have been involved in political processes. Gleadle's published works include:

 "The juvenile enlightenment: British children and youth during the French Revolution", Past and Present, vol. 233, issue 1 (2016), pp. 143–184
 "'The riches and treasures of other countries': women, empire and maritime expertise in early Victorian London", Gender & History, vol. 25, no. 1 (2013), pp. 7–26
 "Gentry, Gender and the Moral economy during the Revolutionary and Napoleonic Wars in Provincial England" in Rappoport, J., and Dalley, L., Economic Women: Desire and Dispossession in Nineteenth-Century British Culture (Ohio State University, 2013)
 "The imagined communities of women's history: current debates and emerging themes, a rhizomatic approach", Women's History Review (2013)
 "'WE WILL HAVE IT': Children and Protest in the Ten Hours Movement" in Goose, N., Honeyman, K. (eds.), Childhood and Child Labour (Ashgate, 2012)
 Borderline Citizens: Women, Gender and Political Culture, 1780–1860 (Oxford University Press USA, 2009)
 British Women in the 19th Century (Palgrave Macillan, 2001)

References 

Year of birth missing (living people)
Living people
Academics of the University of Oxford
Fellows of University College, Oxford
Fellows of Mansfield College, Oxford